"It's Your Life" is a song by the British rock band Smokie from their 1977 studio album Bright Lights & Back Alleys. It first came out in June 1977 as a single and later appeared on the album, which was released in late September.

Background and writing 
The song was written by Nicky Chinn and Mike Chapman and produced by Mike Chapman.

Charts

Weekly charts

Year-end charts

References

External links 
 "It's Your Life" at Discogs

1977 songs
1977 singles
Smokie (band) songs
Songs written by Nicky Chinn
Songs written by Mike Chapman
Song recordings produced by Mike Chapman
RAK Records singles